

2016 Summer Olympics (Test event)
 Dressage winner:  Marcelo Tosi with horse BRIEFING DB Z
 Cross Country winner:  Márcio Jorge with horse CORONEL MCJ
 Jumping winner:  Márcio Jorge with horse CORONEL MCJ

International Federation for Equestrian Sports (FEI)

FEI World Cup Show jumping
 April 5, 2014 – April 19, 2015: 2014–15 FEI World Cup Show Jumping season
April 5, 2014 – November 23, 2014: 2014 FEI Japan League
 Overall winner:  Tae Sato (with horse Vrouwe Toltien)
 April 24, 2014 – July 5, 2014: 2014 FEI Central Asian League
 Overall winner:  Rinat Galimov (with horse Charlize)
 April 25, 2014 – October 7, 2014: 2014 FEI China League
 Overall winner:  Zhao Zhiwen (with horse Bolero)
 April 25, 2014 – January 25, 2015: 2014–15 FEI Australian League
 Overall winner:  Tim Clarke (with horse Caltango)
 May 1, 2014 – November 30, 2014: 2014 FEI Central European League South
 Overall winner:  Tomaž Laufer (with horse Heart Stealer)
 May 14, 2014 – November 16, 2014: 2014 FEI South African League
 Overall winner:  Nicole Horwood (with horse Capital Don Cumarco)
 May 14, 2014 – November 23, 2014: 2014 FEI South American South League
 Overall winner:  Sergio Henriques Neves Marins (with horse Landpeter do Feroleto)
 May 28, 2014 – February 22, 2015: 2014–15 FEI North American League West
 Overall winner:  Susan Artes (with horse Zamiro)
 June 5, 2014 – November 15, 2014: 2014 FEI Caucasian League
 Overall winner:  Kanan Novruzov (with horse Concorde 57)
 June 12, 2014 – December 7, 2014: 2014 FEI Central European League North
 Overall winner:  Andrius Petrovas (with various horses)
 June 13, 2014 – August 18, 2014: 2014 FEI South American North League
 Overall winner:  Camilo Rueda (with horse Cassaro 5)
 July 23, 2014 – March 22, 2015: 2014–15 FEI North American League East
 Overall winner:  Todd Minikus (with horse Quality Girl)
 October 10, 2014 – February 7, 2015: 2014–15 FEI Arab League
 Overall winner:  Abdullah Al-Sharbatly (with various horses)
 October 16, 2014 – March 1, 2015: 2014–15 FEI Western European League
 Overall winner:  Steve Guerdat (with various horses)
 October 22, 2014 – January 11, 2015: 2014–15 FEI New Zealand League
 Overall winner:  Katie Laurie (with various horses)
 October 24, 2014 – November 30, 2014: 2014 FEI South East Asian League
 Overall winner:  Siengsaw Lertratanachai (with horse Viranka B)
 March 12–15: 2015 FEI Central European League Final in  Warsaw
 Winner:  Marcel Marschall (with horse Undercontract)
 April 15–19: 2015 FEI World Cup Finals (show jumping and dressage) in  Las Vegas
 Winner:  Steve Guerdat (with horse Albfeuhren's Paille)

FEI World Cup Dressage
 May 23, 2014 – March 22, 2015: 2014–15 FEI World Cup Dressage season
 May 23, 2014 – October 12, 2014: 2014 FEI Central European League 
 Winner:  Elena Sidneva (with horse Romeo-Star)
 June 6, 2014 – March 22, 2015: 2014–15 FEI North American League
 Winner:  Steffen Peters (with horse Legolas 92)
 July 17, 2014 – January 25, 2015: 2014–15 FEI Asia/Pacific League
 July 17–20, 2014: 2014 Brisbane QLD in 
 Grand Prix:  Suzanne Hearn (with horse Remmington)
 Grand Prix Freestyle to Music:  Chantal Wigan (with horse Ferero)
 Grand Prix Special:  Suzanne Hearn (with horse Remmington)
 October 23–26, 2014: 2014 Sydney NSW in 
 Grand Prix:  Heath Ryan (with Regardez Moi)
 Grand Prix Freestyle to Music:  Heath Ryan (with Regardez Moi)
 November 20–23, 2014: 2014 Melbourne Equitana VIC in 
 Grand Prix:  Heath Ryan (with Regardez Moi)
 Grand Prix Freestyle to Music:  Heath Ryan (with Regardez Moi)
 January 21–25, 2015: 2015 Boneo VIC in 
 Grand Prix:  Mary Hanna (with horse Umbro)
 Grand Prix Freestyle to Music:  Mary Hanna (with horse Umbro)
 October 16, 2014 – March 15, 2015: 2014–15 FEI Western European League
 Winner:  Edward Gal (with horse Glock's Underground)
 April 15–19: 2015 FEI World Cup Finals in  Las Vegas (shared with the show jumping event)
 Winner:  Charlotte Dujardin (with horse Valegro)

FEI Nations Cup in Show Jumping
 February 10 – September 6: 2015 FEI Nations Cup Show Jumping Schedule
 February 10–15: Cup #1 in  Ocala, Florida
 Team Jumping winners: 
 Darragh Kenny with horse Picolo
 Lorcan Gallagher with horse Diktator van de Boslehoeve
 Kevin Babington with horse Shorapur, and 
 Conor Swail with horse Grafton
 February 18–21: Cup #2 in  Abu Dhabi
 Team Jumping winners: 
 Ali Al Rumaihi with horse Gunder 
 Khalid Al Emadi with horse Tamira IV 
 Sheikh Ali Bin Khalid Al Thani with horse Vienna Olympic, and 
 Bassem Hassan Mohammed with horse Palloubet d'Halong
 April 23–26: Cup #3 at the  Coapexpan Equestrian Club in Xalapa
 Team Jumping winners: 
 Candice King with horse Kismet 50
 Callan Solem with horse VDL Wizard
 Ali Wolff with horse Casall, and 
 Brianne Goutal with horse Nice de Prissey
 April 29 – May 3: Cup #4 in  Lummen
 Team Jumping winners: 
 Luca Maria Moneta with horse Neptune Brecourt
 Lorenzo de Luca with horse Erco van T Roosakker
 Daniele Augusto Da Rios with horse For Passion, and 
 Piergiorgio Bucci with horse Casallo Z
 May 7–10: Cup #5 in  Linz–Ebelsberg
 Team Jumping winners: 
 Zuzana Zelinkova with horse Caleri II
 Emma Augier de Moussac with horse Charly Brown
 Ondrej Zvara with horse Cento Lano, and 
 Ales Opatrny with horse Acovardo
 May 14–17: Cup #6 in  La Baule-Escoublac
 Team Jumping winners: 
 Joe Clee with horse Utamaro D'Ecaussines
 Spencer Roe with horse Wonder Why
 Guy Williams with horse Titus, and
 Michael Whitaker with horse Cassionato
 May 14–17: Cup #7 in  Odense
 Team Jumping winners: 
 Gilles Dunon with horse Fou de Toi v. Keihoeve
 Catherine van Roosbroeck with horse Gautcho da Quinta
 Wilm Vermeir with horse Garrincha Hedoniste, and
 Jerome Guery with horse Papillon Z
 May 21–24: Cup #8 in  Rome
 Team Jumping winners: 
 Holly Gillott with horse Dougie Douglas
 Robert Whitaker with horse Catwalk IV
 Michael Whitaker with horse Cassionato, and
 John Whitaker with horse Argento
 May 28–31: Cup #9 in  Lisbon
 Team Jumping winners: 
 Alberto Marquez Galobardes with horse Belcanto Z
 Gerardo Menendez Mieres with horse Cassino DC
 Laura Roquet Puignero with horse Quilate del Duero, and
 Ivan Serrano Saenz with horse Condor
 June 4–7: Cup #10 in  Sopot
 Team Jumping winners: 
 André Thieme with horse Conthendrix
 Janne Friederike Meyer with horse Goja
 Holger Wulschner with horse BSC Cavity, and
 Patrick Stühlmeyer with horse Lacan
 June 4–7: Cup #11 in  St. Gallen
 Team Jumping winners: 
 Piete Devos with horse Dream of India Greenfield
 Niels Bruynseels with horse Pommeau du Heup
 Jos Verlooy with horse Domino, and
 Grégory Wathelet with horse Conrad de Hus
 June 17–21: Cup #12 in  Rotterdam
 Team Jumping winners: 
 Ben Maher with horse Diva II
 Joe Clee with horse Utamaro D'Ecaussines
 Jessica Mendoza with horse Spirit T, and 
 Michael Whitaker with horse Cassionato
 July 9–12: Cup #13 in  Falsterbo
 Team Jumping winners: 
 Harrie Smolders with horse Emerald
 Maikel van der Vleuten with horse Vdl Groep Verdi Tn N.O.P.
 Leopold van Asten with horse Vdl Groep Zidane, and
 Gerco Schröder with horse Glock'S Cognac Champblanc
 July 16–19: Cup #14 in  Budapest
 Team Jumping winners: 
 Sören Pedersen with horse Tailormade Chaloubet
 Rikke Haastrup with horse Qualico du Bobois
 Thomas Sandgaard with horse Amarone, and 
 Andreas Schou with horse Allstar
 July 23–26: Cup #15 in  Bratislava
 Team Jumping winners: 
 Geoffroy de Coligny with horse Qaid Louviere
 Marc Le Berre with horse Rubis du Rustick
 Bernard Briand Chevalier with horse Qadillac du Heup, and
 Francois Xavier Boudant with horse Stella Lyght
 July 30 – August 2: Cup #16 in  Hickstead, West Sussex
 Team Jumping winners: 
 Pieter Devos with horse Dylano
 Judy Ann Melchior with horse As Cold As Ice Z
 Gudrun Patteet with horse Sea Coast Pebles Z, and 
 Olivier Philippaerts with horse H&M Armstrong van de Kapel
 August 5–9: Cup #17 in  Dublin
 Team Jumping winners: 
 Bertram Allen with horse Romanov
 Greg Patrick Broderick with horse Mhs Going Global
 Cian O'Connor with horse Good Luck, and 
 Darragh Kenny with horse Sans Soucis Z
 August 26–31: Cup #18 in  Gijón
 Team Jumping winners: 
 Alexandre Fontanelle with horse Prime Time des Vagues
 Cyril Bouvard with horse Quasi Modo Z
 Adeline Hecart with horse Pasha du Gue, and
 Aymeric de Ponnat with horse Ricore Courcelle
 September 2–6: Cup #19 (final) in  Arezzo
 Team Jumping winners: 
 Marlon Módolo Zanotelli with horse Valetto Jx
 Karina Johannpeter with horse Casper
 Yuri Mansur Guerios with horse Cornetto K, and 
 Bernardo Alves with horse Vatson Sitte
 September 24–27: 2015 FEI Nations Cup in Show Jumping Series Final in  Barcelona
 Team Jumping winners: 
 Olivier Philippaerts with horse H&M Armstrong van de Kapel
 Judy-Ann Melchior with horse As Cold As Ice Z
 Jos Lansink with horse For Cento, and
 Grégory Wathelet with horse Conrad de Hus

FEI Nations Cup in Dressage
 March 4 – July 19: 2015 FEI Nations Cup Dressage Schedule
 March 4–8: Cup #1 in  Vidauban
 Individual Dressage winner:  Dominique Filion (with horse Wenicienta)
 Team Dressage winners: 
 Victoria Michalke with horse Dance On OLD 
 Thomas Wagner with horse Amoricello
 Sanneke Rothenberger with horse Wolke Sieben 21, and
 Bernadette Brune with horse Spirit of the Age OLD
 March 24–28: Cup #2 in  Wellington, Florida
 Individual Dressage winner:  Laura Graves (with horse Verdades)
 Team Dressage winners:  
 Olivia LaGoy-Weltz with horse Rassing's Lonoir
 Kimberly Herslow with horse Rosmarin 
 Allison Brock with horse Rosevelt, and
 Laura Graves with horse Verdades
 June 17–21: Cup #3 in  Rotterdam
 Individual Dressage winner:  Patrick Kittel (with horse Watermill Scandic)
 Team Dressage winners: 
 Patrick van der Meer with horse Uzzo
 Diederik van Silfhout with horse Arlando N.O.P.
 Hans Peter Minderhoud with horse Glock's Johnson TN, and 
 Edward Gal with horse Glock's Undercover N.O.P
 July 8–12: Cup #4 in  Hagen
 Individual Dressage winner:  Kristina Bröring-Sprehe (with horse Desperados FRH)
 Team Dressage winners: 
 Hubertus Schmidt with horse Imperio 3
 Jessica von Bredow-Werndl with horse Unee BB
 Isabell Werth with horse Don Johnson FRH, and
 Kristina Bröring-Sprehe with horse Desperados FRH
 July 9–12: Cup #5 in  Falsterbo
 Individual Dressage winner:  Tinne Vilhelmson-Silfvén (with horse Don Auriello)
 Team Dressage winners: 
 Emelie Nyrerod with horse Miata
 Minna Telde with horse Santana
 Tinne Vilmhelmson-Silfven with horse Don Auriello, and
 Patrik Kittel with horse Deja
 July 15–19: Cup #6 (final) in  Hickstead, West Sussex
 Individual Dressage winner:  Carl Hester (with horse Wanadoo)
 Team Dressage winners: 
 Anders Dahl with horse Wie-Atlantico de Ymas
 Sune Hansen with horse Charmeur, and
 Sidsel Johansen with horse Alibi D

FEI Nations Cup in Eventing
 March 19 – October 11: 2015 FEI Nations Cup Eventing Schedule
 March 19–22: Cup #1 in  Fontainebleau
 Individual winner:  Michael Jung (with horse La Biosthetique – SAM FBW)
 Team winners: 
 Gwendolen Fer with horse Romantic Love
 Arnaud Boiteau with horse Quoriano 'Ene HN'
 Hélène Vattier with horse Quito de Baliere, and 
 Karim Laghouag with horse Entebbe de Hus
 April 24–26: Cup #2 in  Ballindenisk, Watergrasshill
 Individual winner:  Emilie Chandler (with horse Gino Royale)
 Team winners: 
 Nicky Roncoroni with horse Stonedge
 Louise Harwood with horse Whitson
 Georgie Strang with horse Cooley Business Time, and
 Izzy Taylor with horse KBIS Starchaser
 May 28–31: Cup #3 in  Houghton Hall
 Individual winner:  Luc Château (with horse Propriano de L'ebat)
 Team winners: 
 Andreas Ostholt with horse So Is It
 Nicholas Bschorer with horse Tom Tom Go
 Dirk Schrade with horse Hope & Skip, and
 Sandra Auffarth with horse Ispo
 June 25–28: Cup #4 in  Strzegom
 Individual winner:  Karin Donckers (with horse Fletcha van't Verahof)
 Team winners: 
 Izzy Taylor with horse KBIS Starburst
 Sarah Bullimore with horse Valentino V
 Emily Llewellyn with horse Greenlawn Sky High, and
 Jodie Amos with horse Figaro van het Broekxhof
 August 11–14: Cup #5 in  Aachen
 Individual winner:  Ingrid Klimke (with horse FRH Escada JS)
 Team winners: 
 Ingrid Klimke with horse Horseware Hale Bob
 Sandra Auffarth with horse Opgun Louvo
 Michael Jung with horse Halunke FBW, and 
 Dirk Schrade with horse Hop and Skip
 September 17–20: Cup #6 in  Montelibretti
 Event cancelled.
 September 24–27: Cup #7 in  Waregem
 Individual winner:  Nana Dalton (with horse Abbeylara Prince)
 Team winners: 
 Andreas Ostholt with horse Pennsylvania 28
 Julia Krajewski with horse Samourai du Thot
 Anna-Maria Rieke with horse Petite Dame, and 
 Andreas Dibowski with horse FRH Butts Avedon
 October 8–11: Cup #8 in  Boekelo (final)
 Individual winner:  Nicola Wilson (with horse Bulana)
 Team winners: 
 Jonty Evans with horse Cooley Rorke’s Drift
 Joseph Murphy with horse Westwinds Hercules
 Cathal Daniels with horse Rioghan Rua, and
 Padraig McCarthy with horse Simon Porloe

Longines Global Champions Tour for show jumping
 April 2 – November 14: 2015 Global Champions Tour
 April 2–4: Tour #1 in  Miami Beach, Florida
 Class 14: Miami Beach 2015 CSI5* 1.60m (Global Champions Tour) Winner:  Scott Brash (with horse Hello Sanctos)
 April 22–25: Tour #2 in  Antwerp
 Class 06: Antwerp 2015 CSI5* 1.60m (Global Champions Tour) Winner:  Simon Delestre (with horse Ryan des Hayettes)
 May 1–3: Tour #3 in  Madrid
 Class 10: Madrid 2015 CSI5* 1.60m (Global Champions Tour) Winner:  Luciana Diniz (with horse Winningmood)
 May 8–10: Tour #4 in  Shanghai
 Class 04: Shanghai 2015 CSI5* 1.60 m (Global Champions Tour) Winner:  Harrie Smolders (with horse Regina Z)
 May 14–17: Tour #5 in  Hamburg
 Class 06: Hamburg 2015 CSI5* 1.60 m (Global Champions Tour) Winner:  Kent Farrington (with horse Voyeur)
 June 11–13: Tour #6 in  Cannes
 Class 14: Cannes 2015 CSI5* 1.60 m (Global Champions Tour) Winner:  Penelope Leprevost (with horse Ratina d'la Rousserie)
 June 25–27: Tour #7 in 
 Class 05: Monaco 2015 CSI5* 1.60m (Global Champions Tour) Winner:  Scott Brash (with horse Hello M'Lady)
 July 3–5: Tour #8 in  Paris
 Class 11: Paris 2015 CSI5* 1.60m (Global Champions Tour) Winner:  Bertram Allen (with horse Romanov)
 July 9–11: Tour #9 in  Cascais–Estoril
 Class 04: Cascais 2015 CSI5* 1.60m (Global Champions Tour) Winner:  Scott Brash (with horse Hello Sanctos)
 July 17–19: Tour #10 in  Chantilly
 Class 04: Chantilly 2015 CSI5* 1.60m (Global Champions Tour) Winner:  Grégory Wathelet (with horse Conrad de Hus)
 July 24–26: Tour #11 in  London
 Class 10: London 2015 CSI5* 1.60m (Global Champions Tour) Winner:  Rolf-Göran Bengtsson (with horse Casall ASK)
 August 13–16: Tour #12 in  Valkenswaard
 Class 06: Valkenswaard 2015 CSI5* 1.60m (Global Champions Tour) Winner:  Marco Kutscher (with horse van Gogh)
 September 11–13: Tour #13 in  Rome
 Class 08: Rome 2015 CSI5* 1.60m (Global Champions Tour) Winner:  Rolf-Göran Bengtsson (with horse Casall ASK)
 September 17–20: Tour #14 in  Vienna
 Class 04: Vienna 2015 CSI5* 1.60m (Global Champions Tour) Winner:  Luciana Diniz (with horse Winningmood)
 November 12–14: Tour #15 (final) in  Doha
 Class 05: Doha 2015 CSI5* 1.60m (Global Champions Tour) Winner:  Luciana Diniz (with horse Fit For Fun)

Spruce Meadows Tournaments for show jumping
 June 3 – September 13: 2015 Spruce Meadows Tournaments in  Calgary
 June 3–7: The National
 Biggest Purse: C$400,000 RBC Grand Prix Presented by ROLEX™
 Winner:  Kent Farrington (with horse Voyeur)
 June 11–14: The Continental
 Biggest Purse: C$210,000 CP Grand Prix
 Winner:  McLain Ward (with horse Rothchild)
 June 24–28: Canada One
 Biggest Purse: C$126,000 Imperial Challenge
 Winner:  Sameh El-Dahan (with horse Sumas Zorro)
 June 30 – July 5: The North American
 Biggest Purse: C$400,000 ATCO Power Queen Elizabeth II Cup
 Winner:  McLain Ward (with horse HH Azur)
 July 9–12: The Pan American
 Biggest Purse: C$400,000 Pan American Cup Presented by ROLEX™
 Winner:  Kent Farrington (with horse Voyeur)
 September 9–13: The Masters (final)
 C$300,000 BMO Nations' Cup
 Winners: 
 Pedro Veniss with horse Quabri de L'Isle 
 Felipe Amaral with horse Premiere Carthoes 
 Eduardo Menezes with horse Quintol, and 
 Rodrigo Pessoa with horse Status
 Biggest Purse: C$1,500,000 CP International Grand Prix Presented by ROLEX™
 Winner:  Scott Brash (with horse Hello Sanctos)

Triple Crown of Thoroughbred Racing
 USA Triple Crown
 May 2: 2015 Kentucky Derby
 Horse:  American Pharoah; Jockey:  Victor Espinoza; Trainer:  Bob Baffert
 May 16: 2015 Preakness Stakes
 Horse:  American Pharoah; Jockey:  Victor Espinoza; Trainer:  Bob Baffert
 June 6: 2015 Belmont Stakes
 Horse:  American Pharoah; Jockey:  Victor Espinoza; Trainer:  Bob Baffert
 Note: A new Triple Crown winner, since 1978, with horse Affirmed.
 United Kingdom Triple Crown
 May 2: 2015 2000 Guineas Stakes
 Horse:  Gleneagles; Jockey:  Ryan Moore; Trainer:  Aidan O'Brien
 June 6: 2015 Epsom Derby
 Horse:  Golden Horn; Jockey:  Frankie Dettori; Trainer:  John Gosden
 September 12: 2015 St. Leger Stakes
 Horse:  Bondi Beach; Jockey:  Colm O'Donoghue; Trainer:  Aidan O'Brien
 Canadian Triple Crown
 July 5: 2015 Queen's Plate
 Horse:  Shaman Ghost; Jockey:  Rafael Manuel Hernandez; Trainer:  Brian A. Lynch
 July 29: 2015 Prince of Wales Stakes
 Horse:  Breaking Lucky; Jockey:  James S. McAleney; Trainer:  Reade Baker
 August 16: 2015 Breeders' Stakes
 Horse:  Danish Dynaformer; Jockey:  Patrick Husbands; Trainer:  Roger Attfield
 Australian Triple Crown
 March 14: 2015 Randwick Guineas
 Horse:  Hallowed Crown; Jockey:  Hugh Bowman; Trainers:  Bart Cummings and James Cummings
 March 21: 2015 Rosehill Guineas
 Horse:   Volkstok'n'barrell; Jockey:  Craig Williams; Trainer:  Donna Logan
 April 4: 2015 Australian Derby
 Horse:  Mongolian Khan; Jockey:  Owen Bosson; Trainer:  Murray Baker
 Hong Kong Triple Crown
 January 25: 2015 Hong Kong Stewards' Cup
 Horse:  Able Friend; Jockey:  João Moreira; Trainer:  John Moore
 March 1: 2015 Hong Kong Gold Cup
 Horse:  Designs On Rome; Jockey:  João Moreira; Trainer:  John Moore
 May 31: 2015 Hong Kong Champions & Chater Cup
 Horse:  Helene Super Star; Jockey:  Douglas Whyte; Trainer:  Anthony S. Cruz

Other equestrian events
 July 1–5: FEI Dressage Children, Junior & Under 21 European Championships 2015 in  Vidauban
 Open Junior Individual Test Dressage winner:  Hannah Erbe with horse Carlos
 Open Under 21 Individual Test Dressage winner:  Dana van Lierop with horse Equestricons Walkuere
 Open Children Individual Test Dressage winner:  Sofia Valentina Hegstrup with horse Santa
 Open Junior Individual Dressage Freestyle winner:  Juan Matute Guimon with horse Dhannie Ymas
 Open Under 21 Individual Dressage Freestyle winner:  Bianca Nowag with horse Fair Play RB
 Open Junior Team Dressage winners:  (Paulina Holzknecht with horse Wells Fargo, Kristin Biermann with horse Zwetcher, Semmieke Rothenberger with horse Geisha, Hannah Erbe with horse Carlos)
 Open Under 21 Team Dressage winners:  (Claire-Louise Averkorn with horse Condio B, Vivien Niemann with horse Don Vertino, Anna-Christina Abbelen with horse Fuerst On Tour, Bianca Nowag with horse Fair Play RB)
 Open Children Team Dressage winners:  (Jorina Miehling with horse Rising Star, Annina Lüthi with horse Odin III, Meiling Ngovan with horse Don Paulo)

References

External links
 International Federation for Equestrian Sports – FEI – official website
 Inside FEI Website

 
Equestrian by year